Shigeru Aoyama (born 27 April 1969) is a Japanese former volleyball player who competed in the 1992 Summer Olympics.

References

1969 births
Living people
Japanese men's volleyball players
Olympic volleyball players of Japan
Volleyball players at the 1992 Summer Olympics
Asian Games medalists in volleyball
Volleyball players at the 1990 Asian Games
Volleyball players at the 1994 Asian Games
Medalists at the 1990 Asian Games
Medalists at the 1994 Asian Games
Asian Games gold medalists for Japan
Asian Games bronze medalists for Japan
20th-century Japanese people